Bidyut Baran Chaudhuri (B. B. Chauduri) is a senior computer scientist and the pro-vice-chancellor (academic) of Techno India University in West Bengal, India. He is also adjuncted to Indian Statistical Institute (ISI), where he was a professor for about three decades. He was the founding Head of Computer Vision and Pattern Recognition Unit (which was established in 1994) of ISI. Moreover, he was a J.C. Bose Fellow and INAE Distinguished Professor at ISI.

He was the vice-president of the Society for Natural Language Technology Research (SNLTR).

His primary research contributes to the fields of computer vision, image processing and pattern recognition. 
He is a pioneer of "Indian language script OCR".

Education
Chaudhuri received his BSc (Hons.), BTech and MTech degrees from University of Calcutta, India in 1969, 1972 and 1974, respectively and PhD Degree from Indian Institute of Technology Kanpur in 1980. He did his post-doc work during 1981-1982 from Queen's University, U.K, through Leverhulme Overseas Fellowship.

Awards and recognition
Chaudhuri has been elected as a Life Fellow of IEEE "for contributions to pattern recognition, especially Indian language script OCR, document processing and natural language processing". 
He has become a Fellow of International Association for Pattern Recognition (IAPR) "for contributions to character recognition and speech synthesis in Indian language".
He is also Fellow of The World Academy of Science (TWAS),
Indian National Science Academy (INSA), Indian National Academy of Engineering (INAE), National Academy of Sciences (NASI),
and Institute of Electronics and Telecommunication Engineering (IETE).
In 2011, Chaudhuri received the Om Prakash Bhasin Award for his contribution in the field of electronics and information technology.

Chaudhuri's interview on some of his works has been reported in Indian newspaper as well.

He is within world's top 2% scientists and top-10 Indian AI scientists according to a study conducted by Stanford University.

References

External links

ISI Official Homepage (old)
INSA
Books at Amazon
Publications from DBLP

1950 births
Living people
Fellow Members of the IEEE
Fellows of the International Association for Pattern Recognition
IIT Kanpur alumni
University of Calcutta alumni
Academic staff of the Indian Statistical Institute
Indian computer scientists
Artificial intelligence researchers
Scientists from Kolkata
Bengali scientists
Fellows of the Indian National Science Academy
Fellows of The National Academy of Sciences, India
Fellows of the Indian National Academy of Engineering
Natural language processing researchers
Computer scientists